Yaxi is a town in Rongcheng City, Weihai, in eastern Shandong province, China. , it administers the following 47 villages:
Beiyaxi Village
Wolongdaijia Village
Panjiagou Village
Congjiazhuang Village
Zhujiakuang Village
Xiliu Village
Beiliu Village
Nanliu Village
Lindaogou Village
Dongshuangding Village
Xishuangding Village
Wujia Village
Wanmazhuang Village
Shipengzi Village
Daijia'an Village
Qiaonantou Village
Songli Village
Xibuqian Village
Budongkuang Village
Nanyaxi Village
Longchuang Village
Beixinzhuang Village
Chejiazhuang Village
Linjiazhuang Village
Qian'an Village
Shangguan Village
Hou'an Village
Guanjia Village
Zhubu Village
Xiaoshankou Village
Dashankou Village
Shangzhuang Village
Yahou Village
Yuandong Village
Dahaopo Village
Shanhe Village
Xiaoliujia Village
Longfeng Village
Shanhelüjia Village
Housuge Village
Xizang Village
Zhuangshangwangjia Village
Beiyuanzhuang Village
Dongbuqian Village
Qiangaojiazhuang Village
Hougaojiazhuang Village
Zhanjiazhuang Village

References

Township-level divisions of Shandong
Rongcheng, Shandong